Beambridge is a village in Shropshire, England.

See also
Listed buildings in Abdon, Shropshire
Listed buildings in Munslow

External links

Villages in Shropshire